Events in the year 1970 in Brazil.

Incumbents

Federal government
President: General Emílio Garrastazu Médici 
Vice President: General Augusto Rademaker

Governors 
 Acre: vacant
 Alagoas: Antônio Simeão de Lamenha Filho 
 Amazonas: Danilo Duarte de Matos Areosa
 Bahia: Luís Viana Filho 
 Ceará: Plácido Castelo
 Espírito Santo: Cristiano Dias Lopes Filho 
 Goiás: Otávio Lage
 Guanabara: Francisco Negrão de Lima (until 15 March); Antonio de Pádua Chagas Freitas (starting 15 March)
 Maranhão: Jose Sarney (until 14 May); Antônio Jorge Dino (from 14 May)
 Mato Grosso: Pedro Pedrossian 
 Minas Gerais: Israel Pinheiro da Silva 
 Pará: Alacid Nunes 
 Paraíba: João Agripino Maia 
 Paraná: Pablo Cruz Pimentel 
 Pernambuco: Nilo Coelho
 Piauí: 
 until 14 May: Helvídio Nunes
 14 May-15 May: João Turíbio Monteiro de Santana
 from 15 May: João Clímaco d'Almeida
 Rio de Janeiro: Geremias de Mattos Fontes
 Rio Grande do Norte: Walfredo Gurgel Dantas 
 Rio Grande do Sul: Walter Peracchi Barcelos 
 Santa Catarina: Ivo Silveira 
 São Paulo: Roberto Costa de Abreu Sodré 
 Sergipe: 
 until 14 May: Lourival Baptista
 14 May-4 June: Wolney Leal de Melo
 from 4 June: João de Andrade Garcez

Vice governors
 Alagoas: Manoel Sampaio Luz 
 Amazonas: Deoclides de Carvalho Leal 
 Bahia: Jutahy Magalhães 
 Ceará: Humberto Ellery
 Espírito Santo: Isaac Lopes Rubim 
 Goiás: Osires Teixeira 
 Maranhão: Antonio Jorge Dino (until 14 May); vacant thereafter (from 14 May) 
 Mato Grosso: Lenine de Campos Póvoas 
 Minas Gerais: Pio Soares Canedo 
 Pará: João Renato Franco 
 Paraíba: Antônio Juarez Farias (from 12 September)
 Paraná: Plínio Franco Ferreira da Costa 
 Pernambuco: Salviano Machado Filho 
 Piauí: João Clímaco d'Almeida (until 14 May); vacant thereafter (from 14 May)
 Rio de Janeiro: Heli Ribeiro Gomes
 Rio Grande do Norte: Clóvis Motta
 Santa Catarina: Jorge Bornhausen 
 São Paulo: Hilário Torloni 
 Sergipe: Manoel Paulo Vasconcelos (until 14 May); vacant thereafter (from 14 May)

Events
March 11 - Japanese consul-general in São Paulo Nobuo Okuchi is kidnapped by the leftist guerrilla group Vanguarda Popular Revolucionária.
March 15 - Nobuo Okuchi is ransomed by the Brazilian government and released in exchange for five political prisoners.
June 11 - West German ambassador Ehrenfried von Holleben is kidnapped by the Vanguarda Popular Revolucionária and by the Ação Libertadora Nacional.
June 21 - Brazil defeats Italy 4–1 at the 1970 FIFA World Cup Final in Mexico. It is the third time Brazil wins the FIFA World Cup.
December 1 - Giovanni Enrico Bucher, the Swiss ambassador to Brazil, is kidnapped by the Ação Libertadora Nacional in Rio de Janeiro; kidnappers demand the release of 70 political prisoners.

Births
April 20 – Adriano Moraes, rodeo performer
June 7 – Ronaldo da Costa, long-distance runner
June 7 – Cafu, footballer

Deaths
February 20 – João Café Filho, 18th President of Brazil (b. 1899)

See also 
1970 in Brazilian football
1970 in Brazilian television
List of Brazilian films of 1970

References

 
1970s in Brazil
Years of the 20th century in Brazil
Brazil
Brazil